Lantern is the thirtieth album by American world music/jazz group Oregon featuring Ralph Towner, Paul McCandless, Paolino Dalla Porta, and Mark Walker recorded in November 2016 and released on the CAM Jazz label in 2017. It is the first Oregon record to feature bassist Paolino Dalla Porta, who replaced Oregon's founding member Glen Moore in 2015.

Reception 

On June 26, 2017, All About Jazz critic John Kelman wrote: "Lantern makes clear that... Oregon remains as effortlessly surprising and holistically inimitable as it's ever been." Regarding the band's new bassist, Kelman remarked: "...while the influx of new blood has altered the group's complexion to some extent, it remains a group that sounds like no other. Simply put: Lantern remains an album that could be made by no-one else but Oregon."

DownBeat's Bobby Reed called the album "terrific," and stated: "Throughout the program, all four musicians' exquisite solos are featured amid polished, profound cohesion. Graceful teamwork is what makes Lantern shine so brightly."

The Guardian's John Ford praised the band's "subtle way with poignant and lyrical music," and commented: "They still sound as if they know how to have some very sophisticated fun."

Cormac Larkin of The Irish Times remarked: "Oregon cover the spectrum from delicate chamber music to full-throated post-bop to funky world grooves."

Track listing 
All compositions by Ralph Towner except where noted.
 "Dolomiti Dance" — 6:11
 "Duende" — 5:59
 "Walk the Walk" (Mark Walker) — 6:35
 "Not Forgotten" — 4:31
 "Hop, Skip and A Thump" — 6:24
 "Figurine" — 2:54
 "The Glide" — 8:07
 "Aeolian Tale" (Paolino Dalla Porta) — 5:46
 "Lantern" (Oregon) — 7:58
 "The Water Is Wide" (Traditional, arranged by Paul McCandless) — 7:07

Personnel 
Paul McCandless – oboe, English horn, soprano saxophone, bass clarinet, flute
Paolino Dalla Porta – bass
Ralph Towner – classical guitar, piano, synthesizer
Mark Walker – drums, hand percussion, drum synthesizer

References 

Oregon (band) albums
2017 albums
CAM Jazz albums